David Allen Kolb (born December 12, 1939, in Moline, Illinois) is an American educational theorist whose interests and publications focus on experiential learning, the individual and social change, career development, and executive and professional education.  He is the founder and chairman of Experience Based Learning Systems, Inc. (EBLS), and an Emeritus Professor of Organizational Behavior in the Weatherhead School of Management, Case Western Reserve University, Cleveland, Ohio.

Kolb earned his BA from Knox College in 1961 and his MA and Ph.D. from Harvard University in 1964 and 1967 respectively, in social psychology.

Experiential learning

In the early 1970s, Kolb and Ron Fry (now both at the Weatherhead School of Management) developed the Experiential Learning Model (ELM), composed of four elements:
concrete experience,
observation of and reflection on that experience,
formation of abstract concepts based upon the reflection,
testing the new concepts,
(repeat).

These four elements are the essence of a spiral of learning that can begin with any one of the four elements, but typically begins with a concrete experience.

While this model is used widely in fields such as management education, it has been criticised for its inflexibility and over-simplification.

Learning Style Inventory
Kolb is renowned in educational circles for his Learning Style Inventory (LSI).  His model is built upon the idea that learning preferences can be described using two continuums: 
 Active experimentation ↔ Reflective observation
 Abstract conceptualization ↔ Concrete experience.  
The result is four types of learners: converger (Active experimentation - Abstract conceptualization), accommodator (Active experimentation - Concrete experience), assimilator (Reflective observation - Abstract conceptualization), and diverger (Reflective observation - Concrete experience).  The LSI is designed to determine an individual's learning preference.

Bibliography
 Kolb, D.A., Rubin, I.M., McIntyre, J.M. (1974).  Organizational Psychology: A Book of Readings, 2nd edition.  Englewood Cliffs, N.J.: Prentice-Hall.
 Kolb, D.A., Fry, R.E. (1974). Toward an Applied Theory of Experiential Learning
 Kolb, D. A., Kolb, A.Y. (2011). The Kolb Learning Style Inventory 4.0
 Peterson, K., & Kolb, D. A. (2017). How You Learn Is How You Live: Using Nine Ways of Learning to Transform Your Life. Berrett-Koehler Publishers.

See also
Experiential learning
Constructivism (philosophy of education)

References

External links

 Kolb's Faculty Profile at Case Western University

21st-century American psychologists
Knox College (Illinois) alumni
Harvard University alumni
Living people
Case Western Reserve University faculty
1939 births
20th-century American psychologists